The 1952 U.S. Women's Open was the seventh U.S. Women's Open, held June 26–29 at Bala Golf Club in Philadelphia, Pennsylvania. It was the final time the event was organized by the LPGA Tour; the United States Golf Association (USGA) has conducted the championship since 1953.

Louise Suggs, the 1949 champion, won the second of her two U.S. Women's Open titles, seven strokes ahead of runners-up Marlene Bauer and Betty Jameson. It was the sixth of eleven major championships for Suggs, whose lead after 36 holes was four strokes, and extended to seven strokes after the third round.

The championship was played in hot weather; temperatures in the first round on Thursday exceeded .

Past champions in the field

Final leaderboard
Sunday, June 29, 1952

Source:

References

External links
USGA final leaderboard
U.S. Women's Open Golf Championship
U.S. Women's Open – past champions – 1952
Bala Golf Club

U.S. Women's Open
Golf in Pennsylvania
Sports in Philadelphia
U.S. Women's Open
U.S. Women's Open
U.S. Women's Open
U.S. Women's Open
Women's sports in Pennsylvania